Amblymora uniformis is a species of beetle in the family Cerambycidae. It was described by Karl Jordan in 1894. It is known from Moluccas.

References

Amblymora
Beetles described in 1894